Kennedy Creek is a tributary of South Branch Tunkhannock Creek in Lackawanna County, Pennsylvania, in the United States. The creek is not designated as an impaired waterbody. The surficial geology in its vicinity consists of Wisconsinan Till, alluvium, bedrock, and fill.

A number of bridges have been constructed over Kennedy Creek. The watershed of the creek is designated as a Coldwater Fishery and a Migratory Fishery. The creek flows through Lackawanna State Park in its lower reaches. It is crossed by two trails in the park and is utilized for canoeing.

Course
Kennedy Creek begins in a small wetland in Scott Township. It flows north for a few tenths of a mile alongside Pennsylvania Route 347 before crossing Pennsylvania Route 632 and turning north-northwest. After a few tenths of a mile, it receives an unnamed tributary from the left and turns north-northeast, flowing close to Newton Hill and Weatherby Hill. After several tenths of a mile, the creek turns north-northwest and then west, crossing Interstate 81. The creek then turns north for a short distance before turning northwest, crossing Pennsylvania Route 524 and entering North Abington Township. Here, it turns southwest, crossing Pennsylvania Route 524 again, before turning northwest for a few tenths of a mile and receiving one unnamed tributary from the left and one from the right.

Kennedy Creek then turns west-northwest for a few miles, flowing through a valley alongside Pennsylvania Route 524. In this reach, the creek passes by Sarnoski Hill and receives two unnamed tributaries from the right. It then turns west for several tenths of a mile, passing by Turkey Hill and receiving another unnamed tributary from the right. The creek then turns northwest for a few tenths of a mile, crossing Pennsylvania Route 524 and heading away from it. It then turns west and enters Lackawanna Lake, where it reaches its confluence with South Branch Tunkhannock Creek.

Hydrology
Kennedy Creek is not designated as an impaired waterbody.

In June 2006, trace concentrations of trichloroethylene were found in Kennedy Creek at the Interstate 81 overpass. However, in September 2006, the creek was found not to contain trichloroethylene, perchloroethylene, or DCE.

Geography and geology

The mouth of Kennedy Creek is located at the Kennedy Creek Inlet. An "exceptionally scenic" ravine with hemlock trees occurs at this inlet.

The surficial geology along much of Kennedy Creek consists of alluvium. However, the surficial geology in the creek's valley as a whole consists mostly of a till known as Wisconsinan Till. There is also a patch of bedrock consisting of sandstone and shale at the creek's mouth and a patch of fill where the creek crosses Interstate 81.

Watershed
The creek is entirely within the United States Geological Survey quadrangle of Dalton. The mouth of the creek is located at Carpenter Town.

The designated use for Kennedy Creek is aquatic life. The creek is one of several major streams to drain Scott Township.

History
Kennedy Creek was entered into the Geographic Names Information System on August 2, 1979. Its identifier in the Geographic Names Information System is 1178368.

A steel stringer/multi-beam or girder bridge carrying Pennsylvania Route 347 over Kennedy Creek was built in 1938 and repaired in 1955. The first of these two bridges was repaired in 1955.

In 2015, members of the "watershed team" of Riverside High School participated in chemical and biological tests on Kennedy Creek.

Biology
The drainage basin of Kennedy Creek is designated as a Coldwater Fishery and a Migratory Fishery. Wild trout naturally reproduce in the creek from its headwaters downstream to its mouth.

Recreation
Kennedy Creek flows through Lackawanna State Park in its lower reaches. In this reach, hunting is permitted on the creek's right side, but not on most of its left side. Two multi-use trails in the park cross the creek. Paddling opportunities in Lackawanna State Park include the Kennedy Creek Inlet. The creek itself has been described as "a favorite of canoeists".

The Countryside Conservancy has an easement called the Hull Easement, which includes some land in the bottomlands along Kennedy Creek, upstream of Lackawanna State Park.

See also
Ackerly Creek, next tributary of South Branch Tunkhannock Creek going downstream
List of rivers of Pennsylvania

References

Rivers of Lackawanna County, Pennsylvania
Tributaries of Tunkhannock Creek
Rivers of Pennsylvania